ETS homologous factor is a protein that in humans is encoded by the EHF gene.
This gene encodes a protein that belongs to an ETS transcription factor subfamily characterized by epithelial-specific expression (ESEs). The encoded protein acts as a transcriptional repressor and may be associated with asthma susceptibility. This protein may be involved in epithelial differentiation and carcinogenesis.

Further reading

Cangemi, R., Mensah, A., Albertini, V., Jain, A., Mello-Grand, M., Chiorino, G., Catapano, C.V. & Carbone, G.M. Reduced expression and tumor suppressor function of the ETS transcription factor ESE-3 in prostate cancer. Oncogene 27, 2877-2885 (2008).

Albino D, Longoni N, Curti L, Mello-Grand M, Pinton S, Civenni G, Thalmann G, D'Ambrosio G, Sarti M, Sessa F, Chiorino G, Catapano CV, Carbone GM. ESE3/EHF controls epithelial cell differentiation and its loss leads to prostate tumors with mesenchymal and stem-like features. Cancer Res. 2012 Jun 1;72(11):2889-900.

Kunderfranco, P., Mello-Grand, M., Cangemi, R., Pellini, S., Mensah, A., Albertini, V., Malek, A., Chiorino, G., Catapano, C.V. & Carbone, G.M. ETS transcription factors control transcription of EZH2 and epigenetic silencing of the tumor suppressor gene Nkx3.1 in prostate cancer. PLoS One 5, e10547 (2010).

References

External links 
 

Transcription factors